Sir George Reeve, 1st Baronet (c. 1618 - October 1678) was an English politician who sat in the House of Commons  from  1660 to 1678.

Reeve was elected in 1660 as MP for Eye in the Convention Parliament. He was re-elected MP for Eye in 1661 to the Cavalier Parliament and sat until his death in 1678. He came from a Royalist family and was generally supportive of the royal court in Parliament. He was created baronet of Thwaite in the County of Suffolk on 22 January 1663. He was succeeded in the baronetcy by his son.

References

1610s births
1678 deaths
Year of birth uncertain
People from Eye, Suffolk
Place of birth missing
English MPs 1660
English MPs 1661–1679
Baronets in the Baronetage of England